Asha Kale is an actress in India's Marathi Language film industry. She was given the V Shantaram lifetime achievement award by the State Government of Maharashtra in 2010.

Driven by destiny, she transformed from a dancer to a multi-talented actress.
Born in Kolhapur city, she worked at "Kalasangh," owned by her maternal uncle Balasaheb Inamdar.

Films 
 Baikocha Bhau (1962)
 Tambadi Maati (1969)
 Satiche Vaan (1969)
 Ashi Rangali Ratra (1970)
 Ganane Ghunguru Haravale (1970)
 Chuda Tuza Savitricha (1971)
 Kunkuvacha Karanda (1971)
 Ghar Gangechya Kathi (1975)
 Jyotibacha Navas (1975)
 Ha Khel Savlyancha (1976)
 Bala Gau Kashi Angai (1977)
 Sasurvashin (1978)
 Aayatya Bilavar Nagoba (1979)
 Ashtavinayak (1979)
 Sansar (1980)
 Satichi Punyai (1980)
 Hich Khari Daulat (1980)
 Ganimi Kawa (1981)
 Kaivari (1981)
 Chandane Shinpit Ja (1982)
 Laxmichi Paule (1982)
 Devta- (1983)
 Thorli Jaau (1983)
 Kulswamini Ambabai (1984)
 Maherchi Manse (1984)
 Ardhangi (1985)
 Chorachya Manat  Chandane (1984)
 Bandivan Mi Ya Sansari (1988)
 Aai Pahije (1988)
 Bandhan (1991)
 Putravati (1996)

Drama 
 Ek Roop Anek Rang
 Ekhadi Tari SmitResha
 Gahire Rang
 Guntata Hruday He
 Ghar Shrimantcha
 Deve Deenaghari Dhavala
 Nal Damayanti
 Paulkhuna
 Fakt Ekach Karan
 Beiman
 Maharani Padmini
 Mumbaichi Manase
 Lahanpan Dega Deva
 Varshav
 Waryaat Misalale Paani
 Wahato hi Durvanchi Judi
 Vishvrukshachi Chaaya
 Vegala Vhayachay Mala
 Sate Lote
 Seemevaroon Parat Ja
 Sangeet Saubhadra

See also
Kashinath Ghanekar

References 

 Awards received by Asha Kale

Living people
Indian film actresses
Actresses from Maharashtra
Actresses in Marathi cinema
20th-century Indian actresses
1948 births